Berrara is a small coastal town in the City of Shoalhaven in New South Wales, Australia. It is located 8 km south of Sussex Inlet on the Tasman Sea and Berrara Creek.

References 

Towns in New South Wales
City of Shoalhaven
Coastal towns in New South Wales